The 15th New York State Legislature, consisting of the New York State Senate and the New York State Assembly, met from January 5 to April 12, 1792, during the fifteenth year of George Clinton's governorship, in New York City.

Background
Under the provisions of the New York Constitution of 1777, the State Senators were elected on general tickets in the senatorial districts, and were then divided into four classes. Six senators each drew lots for a term of 1, 2, 3 or 4 years and, beginning at the election in April 1778, every year six Senate seats came up for election to a four-year term. Assemblymen were elected countywide on general tickets to a one-year term, the whole assembly being renewed annually.

In March 1786, the Legislature enacted that future Legislatures meet on the first Tuesday of January of each year unless called earlier by the governor. No general meeting place was determined, leaving it to each Legislature to name the place where to reconvene, and if no place could be agreed upon, the Legislature should meet again where it adjourned.

On February 7, 1791, the Legislature re-apportioned the Senate and Assembly districts, according to the figures of the United States Census of 1790. The area of Columbia and Rensselaer counties were transferred from the Western to the Eastern District; and the Southern and the Western districts lost one senator each, which were added to the Eastern District. The total number of assemblymen was again set at 70; but several new counties were established: Herkimer (1 seat), Ontario (1), Otsego (1), Rensselaer (5), Saratoga (4) and Tioga (1); Kings, Orange, Queens, Richmond, Suffolk, Ulster and Westchester lost 1 seat, and Montgomery and New York lost 2; and Columbia won 3 seats.

At this time the politicians were divided into two opposing political parties: the Federalists and the Democratic-Republicans. Party lines were not as distinctly drawn then as they became during the 19th century. Some politicians changed sides, for example the Livingston faction of the Federalist Party who felt betrayed after the election of Rufus King over their candidate James Duane in the United States Senate election in New York, 1789 and later voted down Schuyler for re-election in 1791.

Elections
The State election was held from April 26 to 28, 1791. Senators Samuel Jones (Southern D.), Thomas Tillotson and Jacobus Swartwout (both Middle D.) were re-elected; and Joshua Sands (Southern D.), William Powers (Eastern D.) and Ex-U.S. Senator Philip Schuyler (Western D.) were also elected to the Senate.

Sessions
The Legislature was to meet for the regular session on January 3, 1792, at Federal Hall in New York City; both Houses assembled a quorum two days later; and adjourned on April 12.

On April 12, 1792, they enacted that the Legislature should meet on the first Tuesday of November every four years, beginning in 1792, to choose presidential electors. The electors should then meet as electoral college at Poughkeepsie.

State Senate

Districts
The Southern District (8 seats) consisted of Kings, New York, Queens, Richmond, Suffolk and Westchester counties.
The Middle District (6 seats) consisted of Dutchess, Orange and Ulster counties.
The Eastern District (5 seats) consisted of Washington, Clinton, Columbia and Rensselaer counties.
The Western District (5 seats) consisted of Albany, Montgomery, Herkimer, Ontario, Otsego, Saratoga and Tioga counties.

Note: There are now 62 counties in the State of New York. The counties which are not mentioned in this list had not yet been established, or sufficiently organized, the area being included in one or more of the abovementioned counties.

Members
The asterisk (*) denotes members of the previous Legislature who continued in office as members of this Legislature.

Employees
Clerk: Abraham B. Bancker

State Assembly

Districts

The City and County of Albany (7 seats)
Columbia County (6 seats)
Dutchess County (7 seats)
Herkimer County (1 seat)
Kings County (1 seat)
Montgomery County (4 seats)
The City and County of New York (7 seats)
Ontario County (1 seat)
Orange County (3 seats)
Otsego County (1 seat)
Queens County (3 seats)
Rensselaer County (5 seats)
Richmond County (1 seat)
Saratoga County (4 seats) 
Suffolk County (4 seats)
Tioga County (1 seat)
Ulster County (5 seats)
Washington and Clinton counties (4 seats)
Westchester County (5 seats)

Note: There are now 62 counties in the State of New York. The counties which are not mentioned in this list had not yet been established, or sufficiently organized, the area being included in one or more of the abovementioned counties.

Assemblymen
The asterisk (*) denotes members of the previous Legislature who continued as members of this Legislature.

Employees
Clerk: John McKesson

Notes

Sources
The New York Civil List compiled by Franklin Benjamin Hough (Weed, Parsons and Co., 1858) [see pg. 108 for Senate districts; pg. 114 for senators; pg. 148f for Assembly districts; pg. 166f for assemblymen]
Election result Senate, Southern D. (only Queens Co.) at project "A New Nation Votes", compiled by Phil Lampi, hosted by Tufts University Digital Library
Election result Assembly, Albany Co. at project "A New Nation Votes"
Election result Assembly, Columbia Co. at project "A New Nation Votes"
Election result Assembly, Kings Co. at project "A New Nation Votes"
Election result Assembly, New York Co. at project "A New Nation Votes"
Election result Assembly, Queens Co. at project "A New Nation Votes"
Election result Assembly, Rensselaer Co. at project "A New Nation Votes"
Election result Assembly, Westchester Co. at project "A New Nation Votes"

1791 in New York (state)
1792 in New York (state)
015